OIST may refer to
Okinawa Institute of Science and Technology, in Japan
Oriental Institute of Science and Technology, in India